Marina Himmighofen (born 11 November 1984) is a German footballer currently playing for the Bundesliga team of the MSV Duisburg. She previously was active for the German federal police and competed in international police football.

Honours

FCR 2001 Duisburg
 Bundesliga: Runner-up (1) 2009–10
 German Cup: Winner (1) 2009–10

References

External links
 

1984 births
Living people
German women's footballers
SC 07 Bad Neuenahr players
SGS Essen players
FCR 2001 Duisburg players
MSV Duisburg (women) players
Frauen-Bundesliga players
Women's association football defenders
Sportspeople from Koblenz
Footballers from Rhineland-Palatinate